Charles Connell was a Canadian politician.

Charles Connell may also refer to:

Charles Gibson Connell (1899–1986), Scottish advocate and ornithologist
Charles Robert Connell (1864–1922), Republican member of the U.S. House of Representatives
Charles Connell and Company, Scottish shipbuilding company
Charles Connell House, historic former home of the Canadian politician
Charlie Connell, see Ottawa Rough Riders all-time records and statistics

See also
Charles O'Connell (disambiguation)